Justice Cornell may refer to:

Francis R. E. Cornell, associate justice of the Minnesota Supreme Court
Gideon Cornell, chief justice of the Rhode Island Supreme Court
John A. Cornell, associate justice of the Connecticut Supreme Court